Steven Mitchell Birnbaum (born January 23, 1991) is an American professional soccer player who is captain of and plays as a center-back for D.C. United.
Birnbaum started every game for D.C. United in the 2018 season. In 2018 he played every minute in all 34 regular season games, and led Major League Soccer in total clearances, headed clearances, and aerials won, and in 2019 he again led the league in headed clearances and aerials won.

Early life
Birnbaum was born in Newport, California, and is Jewish. His hometown is Irvine, California. His mother is Peggy (Schmidt) Birnbaum, who played softball and volleyball at the University of Missouri.

He completed high school early at Northwood High School at age 17. Birnbaum also played volleyball and lacrosse in high school.

Career

Youth and college

Birnbaum played in the U.S. Soccer Development Academy for Southern California club Pateadores, of which he was the captain.  He played for the U.S. U-18 and U.S. U-20 national teams in tournaments in Portugal and Mexico in 2008.

He played 72 games over five years of college soccer on scholarship at the University of California, Berkeley for the California Golden Bears men's soccer team, between 2009 and 2013, though redshirted the 2012 season, and was team captain. Birnbaum majored in social welfare. He was  2010 and 2011 Pac-12 All-Academic honorable mention, 2011 and 2013 All-Pac-12 first team, 2011 Jewish Sports Review first-team All-American, a 2013 Missouri Athletic Club Hermann Trophy semifinalist, an National Soccer Coaches Association of America (NSCAA) 2013 First Team All-American, NSCAA 2013 First Team All-Far-West Team, and a finalist for the Soccer News Net College Boot Player of the Year Award.  While at college, Birnbaum also appeared for USL PDL club Orange County Blue Star in 2010 and 2011.

In 2012, he won a silver medal with the U.S. team in the 2012 Pan American Maccabi Games in Brazil.

Professional
Birnbaum was selected in the first round (2nd overall) of the 2014 MLS SuperDraft on January 14, 2014, by D.C. United. He was loaned out to their USL Pro affiliate Richmond Kickers in March 2014, making his professional debut on April 5, 2014 in a 3–1 win over the Pittsburgh Riverhounds. He is a crucial player of D.C. United because of his great defensive capabilities, and has played for them since 2014.

Following an injury to Jeff Parke, in 2014 Birnbaum became United's starting center back alongside Bobby Boswell.  Birnbaum was named a finalist for the 2014 MLS Rookie of the Year, but lost to Tesho Akindele.

Birnbaum scored his first goal for United on February 26, 2015, in a CONCACAF Champions League quarterfinal leg against Alajuelense. In 2016, Birnbaum was the subject of several rumors regarding a possible transfer to Europe or Israel, with Maccabi Tel Aviv offering $1.5 million and mentioned as one possible destination. He was an MLS All Star in 2016. He became the team captain in 2017.

Birnbaum started every game for D.C. United in the 2018 season. In 2018 he played a career-high and club record 3,060 minutes, playing every minute in all 34 regular season games.  He led the league in total clearances (217), headed clearances (120), and aerials won (173), and came in 6th in the voting for the MLS Defender of the Year Award.

In 2019, Birnbaum again started every game for D.C. United. His teamwork with fellow defender, Frédéric Brillant, and goalkeeper, Bill Hamid, helped DC to concede the lowest number of goals in the Eastern Conference in 2019. In 2019 he led the MLS in headed clearances (109) and aerials won (177).

International
Birnbaum played for the United States U18 and United States U20 national teams in 2008.

Birnbaum debuted for the United States men's national soccer team on January 28, 2015. His first goal for the USMNT was a 90th-minute winner versus Iceland on January 31, 2016, a game in which he had already provided an equalizing assist to Michael Orozco to make it 2-2. He also played for the team in the 2016 Copa América Centenario and World Cup Qualifiers. In 2017, he played against Serbia and Jamaica.

Accolades
Birnbaum was inducted into the Greater Washington Jewish Sports Hall of Fame in 2017.  He was inducted into the Southern California Jewish Sports Hall of Fame in 2020.

Personal life 
Birnbaum married his fiancé, Jeanne, on December 15, 2018, in Virginia. They live in Logan Circle in Washington, D.C. He and Jeanne had a daughter together in October 2019 and a son in December 2020.

Statistics

College

Club

International 

|-
| 1. || January 31, 2016 || StubHub Center, Carson, California ||  ||  || 3–2 || Friendly || United States vs. Iceland - January 31, 2016 - Soccerway
|}

See also
List of select Jewish football (association; soccer) players

References

External links

1991 births
Living people
All-American men's college soccer players
American soccer players
Association football defenders
California Golden Bears men's soccer players
Copa América Centenario players
D.C. United draft picks
D.C. United players
Jewish American sportspeople
Jewish footballers
Major League Soccer All-Stars
Major League Soccer players
Orange County Blue Star players
People from Mendocino County, California
Richmond Kickers players
Soccer players from California
Soccer players from Washington, D.C.
Sportspeople from Irvine, California
Sportspeople from Newport Beach, California
USL Championship players
United States men's international soccer players
United States men's under-20 international soccer players
United States men's youth international soccer players
USL League Two players
People from Northwest (Washington, D.C.)
21st-century American Jews